Paul Pîrjol (born 29 October 1990) is a Romanian former weightlifter, amateur boxer and armwrestler, and currently professional strongman competitor and entrant to the World's Strongest Man competition. He is the son of Mircea (another strongman and former national bodybuilding champion) and Mirela Pîrjol, a two-time World Champion armwrestler.

Biography
Pîrjol was three time Romania's Strongest Man in 2009, 2010 and 2011.

He then went on to compete internationally at the age of seventeen and a couple of years later his progression has culminated in a 2011 World's Strongest Man invitation.

Personal Records
Deadlift –

References

Romanian strength athletes
Living people
1990 births
Sportspeople from Bucharest